Ra (hiragana: ら; katakana: ラ) is one of the Japanese kana, which each represent one mora. Both versions are written with two strokes and have origins in the character 良; both characters represent the sound . The Ainu language uses a small katakana ㇻ to represent a final r sound after an a sound (アㇻ ar). The combination of an R-column kana letter with handakuten ゜- ら゚ in hiragana, and ラ゚ in katakana was introduced to represent [la] in the early 20th century.

Stroke order

Other communicative representations

 Full Braille representation

 Computer encodings

See also
Japanese phonology

References
The Compact Nelson Japanese-English Character Dictionary, (Andrew N Nelson,  John H Haig) Tuttle Publishing, 1999

Specific kana